Yeswanthpur is one of the 224 constituencies in the Karnataka Legislative Assembly of Karnataka a south state of India. It is also part of Bangalore North Lok Sabha constituency.

Members of Legislative Assembly

Mysore State (Bangalore North constituency)
 1951 (Seat-1): K. V. Byre Gowda, Indian National Congress
 1951 (Seat-2): R. Munisamaiah, Indian National Congress
 1957 (Seat-1): K. V. Byregowda, Indian National Congress
 1957 (Seat-2): Y. Ramakrishna, Indian National Congress

Mysore State (Yeshvanthapura constituency)
 1962: K. V. Byre Gowda, Indian National Congress
 1967-1973: Seat did not exist. See : Uttarahalli

Karnataka State
 1973-2008: Seat did not exist. See : Uttarahalli
 2008: Shobha Karandlaje, Bharatiya Janata Party
 2013: S. T. Somashekhar, Indian National Congress
 2018: S. T. Somashekhar, Indian National Congress
 2019 (By-Poll): S. T. Somashekhar, Bharatiya Janata Party

See also
 Bangalore Urban district
 List of constituencies of Karnataka Legislative Assembly

References

Assembly constituencies of Karnataka
Bangalore Urban district